Dennis Princewell Stehr (born May 15, 1984), better known by his stage name Mr. Probz, is a Dutch music producer, singer and singer-songwriter. 

He became known for the songs Drivin''', Sukkel voor de liefde, Nothing Really Matters and his collaborations with many hip-hop artists from the United States. In 2013, Mr. Probz made his breakthrough to the general public with the guitar ballad Waves. In 2014, Mr. Probz also released the Waves remix by German DJ Robin Schulz. With both versions, Mr. Probz reached the No. 1 position on the charts in 51 countries. The single was nominated for a Grammy. Mr. Probz became the first Dutch artist to achieve one billion streams on Spotify.

As founder of music label Left Lane Recordings, Mr. Probz is involved in writing, producing and releasing music. In the past, the singer has worked on both Dutch and English music. He has collaborated with Chris Brown, 50 Cent, Anderson Paak, Afrojack, Armin van Buuren, Hardwell, Galantis and Dolly Parton, among others. In addition, Mr. Probz is active as an entrepreneur in real estate, among other things.

 Career 
2008–2013
Mr. Probz began expressing himself creatively as a graffiti artist and later incorporated his daily activities into lyrics. In the first Dutch hip-hop film Bolletjes Blues (2006), he played the lead role of Jimmy. In 2010, Mr. Probz was nominated for a BNN/State Award in the 'Best Artist' category. On August 7, 2010, Mr. Probz and another rapper were shot in Amsterdam. This incident received a lot of media attention. 

2013–present
At the end of 2013, a fire erupted in Mr. Probz's studio and home in which he lost all his possessions except a box of important documents and a laptop with some of his compositions. Shortly after the fire, he achieved success with his first official single Waves. 

On September 16, 2013, Mr. Probz released his hip-hop solo album titled The Treatment. He decided to release his album for free in gratitude for all the support he received from his fans after the fire.
With Waves Mr. Probz won several awards including an Edison, national and international Buma Awards, 'Best Vocal' and 'Best Single' at the FunX Music Awards and 'Best Single' at the 3FM Awards. The multi-platinum single Waves is still at No. 1 on the top 1000 singles of the Dutch charts since 1956. In April 2014, Mr. Probz released a remix of Waves by German DJ Robin Schulz. The single earned a Grammy nomination in the "Best Remixed Recording" category in 2015. He featured on 50 Cent's single "Twisted", which was released in May 2014. 

In September 2014, Mr. Probz released the single Nothing Really Matters. In October, Nothing Really Matters rose to first place in the charts in several European countries. In the Dutch Top 100 for singles, the song ranked first place for 6 weeks. In 2015, the single by Mr. Probz and DJ Armin van Buuren 'Another You' reached the top of the Billboard Dance Chart. 
Following this success, it was announced in 2016 that Mr. Probz was participating in Armin van Buuren's world tour. In 2017, a documentary about Mr. Probz's life was released. This documentary, titled Against the Stream, was released through Red Bull TV and RTL5. 
Mr. Probz scored a hit with Faith in 2019. He created this song in collaboration with the Swedish DJ duo Galantis and Dolly Parton.

In 2020, Mr. Probz and his label Left Lane Recordings sued the record company Sony Music for allegedly failing to comply with the licensing agreement and paying royalties in a timely. In the summary proceedings, the court ruled in favor of Mr. Probz and his label Left Lane Recordings. According to the ruling, Sony Music defaulted on its contractual obligations, this allowed Mr. Probz to regain control of the exploitation of his music. In 2022, Mr. Probz again filed legal proceedings against Sony Music, accusing Sony Music of deliberately failing to calculate his cut of any income on an ‘at source’ basis and of withholding bookkeeping files that his accountants need to see to effectively audit the money he is due.

Mr. Probz is among the best-earning Dutch artists along with Martin Garrix, Afrojack, DJ Tiësto, Armin van Buuren, Giorgio Tuinfort and André Rieu.

Discography

Albums

Extended plays

Singles

As lead artist

As featured artistNotesOther appearances

References

NotesA  The original version of "Waves" was released in November 2013 and has charted in Australia, Belgium, Netherlands and New Zealand.B'  The original version of "Waves" appears on the EP Against the Stream, while the remix appears on the album Prayer''.

Sources

Dutch record producers
1984 births
Living people
Dutch rappers
People from Zoetermeer
Dutch people of Curaçao descent
Dutch people of Danish descent